Georgios Koutsoupias (born 11 February 1974) is a Greek retired footballer.

Personal life 
His son Ilias Koutsoupias is now a professional footballer.

References 

Greek footballers
Living people
Association football defenders
1974 births
SK Sturm Graz players
Footballers from Agrinio